This is a list of fellows of the Royal Society elected in 1978.

Fellows
Roger Yate Stanier  (1916–1982)
Sir Graham Selby Wilson  (1895–1987)
Alan Frank Gibson  (1923–1988)
Richard Rado  (1906–1989)
Malcolm Davenport Milne  (1915–1991)
Fergus William Campbell  (1924–1993)
Janos Szentagothai  (1912–1994)
Hans Walter Kosterlitz  (1903–1996)
Thomas Philip Stroud Powell  (1923–1996)
Torbjorn Oskar Caspersson  (1910–1997)
James Stanley Hey  (1909–2000)
Barry Edward Johnson  (1937–2002)
Sir Frederick William Page  (1917–2005)
John Rodney Quayle  (d. 2006)
Alastair Ian Scott  (1928–2007)
Donald Allan Ramsay  (d. 2007)
Joseph Victor Smith  (d. 2007)
Sir Denis Eric Rooke  (d. 2008)
John Lander Harper  (d. 2009)
George Alan Garton  (d. 2010)
Har Gobind Khorana  (1922–2011)
John Arthur Joseph Pateman  (1926–2011)
John Murdoch Mitchison  (d. 2011)
Ainsley Iggo  (1924–2012)
Charles Walter Suckling  (1920–2013)
Sir Jack Edward Baldwin
Norman Keith Boardman
Alexander Boksenberg
Keith Anthony Browning
Philip George Burke
Sydney Cohen
Roger Arthur Cowley
Gordon Henry Dixon
Murray Gell-Mann  (1929–2019)
Archibald Howie
Donald Lynden-Bell
John (Jake) MacMillan
Sir Robin Buchanan Nicholson
Ronald Oxburgh, Baron Oxburgh
Bernard Leslie Shaw
John Hyslop Steele (1926–2013)
John Francis Talling (1929–2017)
Edwin William Taylor
Peter Whittle
Charles, Prince of Wales

References

1978
1978 in science
1978 in the United Kingdom